A winter garden is a kind of garden maintained in wintertime.

History 
The origin of the winter garden dates back to the 17th to 19th centuries where European nobility would construct large conservatories that would house tropical and subtropical plants and would act as an extension of their living space. Many of these would be attached to their main palaces. Earlier versions would be constructed of masonry with large windows and a glass roof, usually in the Classical or Gothic styles.  While in the 19th century many of these conservatories were made out of iron and curvilinear glass. Winter gardens were not just restricted to private residence, many were built for the greater public. The first large public winter garden was built in 1842–46 in Regent's Park, and was used  for evening occasions, large flower shows and social gatherings. Other winter gardens, such as the Crystal Palace by Sir Joseph Paxton in 1851, were soon built and used for a variety of purposes.

Present 
The modern winter garden is usually a garden planted either to produce food, or at least to remain visibly planted and slowly develop, throughout the winter, or else a garden whose plants will serve as living decoration all winter. One basic premise, in temperate or colder regions, to the winter garden is that the plants may indeed become dormant when snow covers the ground, but will grow each time the sun heats at least part of the plant to above freezing (snow or not), especially in regions where snow cover and below-freezing temperatures are not constant for months at a time.

Vegetables that are typically, or can be, used in a winter garden include:

 Several breeds of winter-hardy cabbage
 Specific winter-hardy breeds of broccoli
 Winter rye is grown where a summer garden will be, in order to protect the ground from weeds, and provide soil amendment when tilled directly into the soil the following spring
 beets
 carrots
 alliums—onions, chives, and their relatives are evergreen, though some may die back during the winter and recover in the spring.
 oregano (including marjoram) -- known to hardily survive the winter up to Zone 5

See also 
 Greenhouse
 Hardiness zone
 Winter sowing

References

External links 
 Underneath the arches The Guardian on Sheffield's public winter garden
 Up From the Ashes Collection

Types of garden
Garden